Jeffrey Bryant Saturday (born June 18, 1975) is an American football former coach and center. He was the interim head coach for the Indianapolis Colts of the National Football League (NFL) for the final 8 weeks of the Colts' 2022 season following the firing of Frank Reich. Saturday played college football at the University of North Carolina and was signed by the Baltimore Ravens as an undrafted free agent in 1998, but was cut by the team without playing a game. Saturday then signed with the Indianapolis Colts, with whom he played 13 seasons, won Super Bowl XLI over the Chicago Bears and was selected to four All-Pro teams and five Pro Bowls. In his final NFL season, he made his sixth Pro Bowl as a member of the Green Bay Packers. Saturday was formerly a sports analyst for ESPN.

Early years
Saturday was born in Atlanta, Georgia. He attended Shamrock High School in Decatur, Georgia, in 1993.

His high school coach Ron Gartrell said in a 2012 Sports Illustrated story on Saturday, "Eighty percent of our offense was behind Jeff. On defense we put Jeff on one side and all our other good players on the other side, because teams ran away from Jeff." However, Gartrell could not sell Southeastern Conference schools on Saturday's abilities; in the same interview, he said that coaches at Georgia and Tennessee considered Saturday too short to play in the conference. He received a scholarship offer from the University of North Carolina partly because of Gartrell's friendship with UNC's then-defensive coordinator Carl Torbush.

College career
Saturday received an athletic scholarship to attend the University of North Carolina at Chapel Hill, where he was a four-year letterman for coach Mack Brown's North Carolina Tar Heels football team from 1994 to 1997. As a junior in 1996 and again as a senior in 1997, he was one of the Tar Heels' team captains. He was recognized as a first-team All-Atlantic Coast Conference (ACC) selection at center in 1996 and 1997, and an Academic All-ACC selection in 1997.

Professional career

Baltimore Ravens
According to Sports Illustrated, Saturday was ranked as the No. 11 center available in the 1998 NFL Draft. He was described as "somewhat an overachiever, has worked to make himself better," but also as "an undersized guy [who] simply has trouble matching up against power NTs that can overwhelm him". He went undrafted. The Baltimore Ravens signed him as a free agent on April 27, 1998, only to waive him on June 12, 1998. He then returned to Raleigh, North Carolina, and took a job as a manager at an electrical supply store.

Indianapolis Colts

Saturday first came to the attention of the Indianapolis Colts during the 1998 season, when former college teammate Nate Hobgood-Chittick was on the roster. As Hobgood-Chittick would recall in 2012,I had no footing at all with that franchise, so I stood outside [Bill] Polian's door in my dirty sweats, saying a prayer. I walked in and said, "There's a guy selling electrical supplies in Raleigh right now who whipped all those first-round draft choices at North Carolina every day." Polian looked at me and said, "I love it. Let's get him in here for a workout."

The Colts signed him as a free agent on January 7, 1999. In his rookie season, Saturday backed up starting guard Steve McKinney, and earned his first NFL start at left guard on November 21, 1999, against the Philadelphia Eagles. After only two regular season starts in 1999, Saturday started all 16 regular season games of the 2000 season at center for the Colts, and continued to start every game thereafter—for a total of 85 consecutive games—before sitting out two games with an injury in December 2004. Saturday finished his time with the Colts as the team's starting center for 12 straight seasons, and was the anchor of the Colts' offensive line, which gave up the fewest quarterback sacks among all NFL teams in the 2004, 2005, and 2006 seasons. Saturday attempted a pass once, during a game in 2004, but it fell incomplete.

Though the Colts won at least 10 regular season games for five consecutive years under head coach Tony Dungy, the team could not get to the Super Bowl, losing in the AFC playoffs from 2002 to 2005. In 2006, the Colts went 12–4 in the regular season and earned the third seed in the AFC. On January 21, 2007, Saturday helped the Colts win the AFC Championship Game against the New England Patriots when he recovered a teammate's fumble in the end zone and scored a touchdown. Saturday also provided the key block on the game-winning touchdown run by Joseph Addai, pancaking Vince Wilfork. Peyton Manning, the Colts' quarterback at the time and a longtime friend, claimed that Saturday wants this play to be known as "The Block." Two weeks later, Saturday helped the Colts win Super Bowl XLI against the Chicago Bears.

On February 26, 2009, Saturday signed a three-year $13.3 million contract with the Colts including a $7.45 million signing bonus.

During his time with the Colts, Saturday started 188 of 197 games. He became a free agent after the 2011 season.

Green Bay Packers

Saturday signed a two-year deal with the Green Bay Packers for $7.75 million on March 23, 2012. After an up-and-down season, Saturday was benched on December 21, 2012. Despite this, Saturday was later announced as the back-up center for the NFC in the 2013 Pro Bowl. In the Pro Bowl, despite being on opposite teams, Saturday and long-time Colts teammate Peyton Manning shared a final snap.

Retirement
On January 25, 2013, Saturday announced he would retire following the 2013 Pro Bowl Game. On March 7, 2013, Saturday signed a 1-day contract with the Colts to retire with the team with which he spent 13 of his 14 seasons.

Honors and awards
Saturday was voted onto six Pro Bowl teams in 2005, 2006, 2007, 2009, 2010, and 2012. For the 2005 and 2007 seasons, he was named to the Associated Press NFL All-Pro First-team. He was selected as Offensive Lineman of the Year by the National Football League Alumni organization for 2007.

Saturday was inducted into the Indianapolis Colts Ring of Honor during the week 2 game against the New York Jets on September 21, 2015.

Saturday was inducted into the Georgia Sports Hall of Fame, in Macon, Georgia, as a member of the 2017 class.

NFL career statistics

Coaching career

Hebron Christian Academy
On January 20, 2017, Saturday was named the head coach of Hebron Christian Academy, in Dacula, Georgia.

On February 14, 2020, Saturday resigned from the position of head coach at Hebron Christian. During his time there he was 20–16 making the playoffs every year while winning three playoff games including one state quarterfinals appearance in 2019.

Indianapolis Colts
On November 7, 2022, the Indianapolis Colts named Saturday as the team's interim head coach after the team fired Frank Reich following a 3–5–1 start. The move generated widespread surprise and criticism, notably from former NFL head coach Bill Cowher, and fellow former offensive lineman Joe Thomas, given Saturday's lack of previous coaching experience beyond the high school level and presence of several former NFL head coaches on the staff. Saturday was the first NFL head coach with no prior college or professional coaching experience since Norm Van Brocklin with the Minnesota Vikings in 1961. Colts owner Jim Irsay defended the move and said that Saturday could potentially remain head coach beyond 2022. General manager Chris Ballard said that the Colts had tried to hire Saturday in 2019 as an offensive line coach and also for a position prior to the 2022 season. Saturday made his head coaching debut against the Las Vegas Raiders, which the Colts won, 25–20.

On December 17, 2022, Saturday's Colts team lost to the Minnesota Vikings by a final score of 39–36. The Colts blew a 33-point lead, which surpassed the 1992 Houston Oilers for the largest blown lead in NFL history. Coincidentally, Frank Reich, who Saturday replaced as Colts head coach, was the quarterback who led the comeback victory for the Buffalo Bills over the Oilers.

In February 2023, the Colts chose to hire Shane Steichen as their head coach after keeping Saturday as interim and a potential candidate to become head coach for the 2023 season.

Head coaching record

* Interim head coach

Personal life

Saturday is a member of the executive committee of the National Football League Players' Association, where he was the key negotiator in completing the 2011 Collective Bargaining Agreement (CBA) between the NFL and NFLPA. Saturday joined ESPN in 2013 and appeared on network programming such as NFL Live and SportsCenter.

Saturday's eldest son, Jeffrey, is a wide receiver for the North Carolina Tarheels football team.

References

External links
	
 
 

1975 births
Living people
American Christians
American Conference Pro Bowl players
American football centers
American sports journalists
American television sports announcers
Baltimore Ravens players
ESPN people
Green Bay Packers players
Indianapolis Colts coaches
Indianapolis Colts head coaches
Indianapolis Colts players
National Conference Pro Bowl players
National Football League announcers
North Carolina Tar Heels football players
People from Decatur, Georgia
Players of American football from Atlanta
Players of American football from Indianapolis
Ed Block Courage Award recipients